Britain in a Day is a crowdsourced documentary film that consists of a series clips of footage shot by members of the public in Britain on 12 November 2011. Scott Free Films and the BBC produced the film, which was made in conjunction with YouTube.

The film is 90 minutes long and includes shots from 314 different perspectives out of the 11,526 submitted onto the video sharing website YouTube.
The film was premiered in cinemas and broadcast on BBC2 on 11 June 2012 for a general audience, as part of the Cultural Olympiad.

Billed as a follow up to the 2011 documentary film Life in a Day, the film was similarly executive produced by Ridley Scott and Kevin Macdonald.
The film was directed by Morgan Matthews.

Cast & Crew

 Saranne Bensusan
 Jonathan Berry
 Lee John Blackmore 
 Jack Keane
 Lawrence Mallinson
 Robin Whittaker 
 Graham Sutton 
 Andrea Dalla Costa
 Jonathan Proud
 Jack Arbuthnott
 Billy Dosanjh
 Ann Lynch
 Martin Phipps
 Peter Christelis
 Yefri Zuñiga 
 Chris Hunter 
 Ben Mills 
 Hugo Adams 
 Danny Freemantle 
 Glenn Freemantle
 Eilam Hoffman 
 Emilie O'Connor
 Adam Scrivener 
 Ian Tapp 
 Craig Brewin
 Archie Campbell 
 Bec Cranswick 
 Raquel Alvarez 
 Alex Ash 
 Corinne Borgeaud 
 Sean James 
 Thomas Carrell 
 Matt Curtis 
 Jemma Gander 
 Caroline Gerard 
 Iain Griffiths 
 Ross Howieson 
 Olivia Humphreys 
 Amy Jackson 
 Joseph Matthews
 Helen Mullane 
 Mike Nicholls 
 Rebecca Pearson
 Claire Salter
 Johannes Schaff
 Daniel Thomas 
 Richard Thorburn 
 Elliot Weaver 
 Zander Weaver 
 Chloe White
 Callum McPherson
 Babs van Gilst
 Ernest Hope Stephenson

See also
Time capsule

References

2012 films
British documentary films
Crowdsourcing
2012 Cultural Olympiad
2010s English-language films
2010s British films